Sidoine is a given name. Notable people with the name include:

Sidoine Beaullia (born 1983), Congolese footballer
Sidoine Benoît, 14th century Benedictine monk, credited for inventing the traditional Normandy, France dish Tripes à la mode de Caen 
Sidoine Oussou (born 1992), Beninese footballer